This is a partial list of people associated with the French Revolution, including supporters and opponents. Note that not all people listed here were French.

See also 
 Glossary of the French Revolution
 List of historians of the French Revolution

Further reading 
 Ballard,  Richard. A New Dictionary of the French Revolution (2011)   excerpt and text search
 Fremont-Barnes, Gregory, ed. The Encyclopedia of the French Revolutionary and Napoleonic Wars: A Political, Social, and Military History (3 vol. 2006)
 Furet, Francois, et al. eds. A Critical Dictionary of the French Revolution (1989) long articles by scholars  excerpt and text search
 Hanson,  Paul R. Historical Dictionary of the French Revolution (2004)
 Ross, Steven T. Historical Dictionary of the Wars of the French Revolution (1998)
 Scott, Samuel F. and Barry Rothaus, eds. Historical Dictionary of the French Revolution (2 vol. 1985)   full text online

 
French Revolution
French Revolution